Walter Clarence Peacock (February 8, 1878 - September 9, 1946), was a Chicago businessman best known as the president of C. D. Peacock Jewelry Company, which was established by his father in 1837. Peacock was also a well known sportsman, particularly as a trap shooter; he won several national championships in this sport. He graduated from the University of Chicago.

Sporting 
Peacock was one of the founding members of the Lincoln Park Gun Club in Chicago. In 1931, he appeared in a live debate on WGN radio with the Chicago Tribune's outdoor editor, Bob Becker, covering perceived decreases in local waterfowl populations. In 1940, he began a movement to form the Civilian's Defense Reserve, a patriotic organization of armed civilians who would cooperate with the U.S. Army during times of need. He believed that the estimated 7 million trapshooters, hunters, and gun club members could help provide a third line of national defense. Peacock was also a previous Illinois Racing Commissioner and a member of the South Shore Country Club.

References 

1878 births
1946 deaths
Businesspeople from Chicago
University of Chicago alumni
Trap and double trap shooters